Ronald James Boden (16 October 1936 – 24 August 2015) was an Australian rugby league footballer who played in the 1950s and 1960s. He played for Parramatta as a centre and also played for Australia, New South Wales and Queensland.

Early life
Born on 16 October 1936 in Coonamble, New South Wales, Boden grew up there before moving to Toowoomba in Queensland and played in the local competition after being spotted by coach former North Sydney player Duncan Thompson.

Playing career
Boden was selected to play for Queensland in 1958 and 1959 while living there to compete against New South Wales in the interstate series.

Parramatta
In 1960, Boden moved to Sydney and joined Parramatta.  In Boden's first season at the club, Parramatta finished last on the table and claimed the wooden spoon.  Despite the club's position on the ladder, Boden was selected to play for Australia in 1960 and New South Wales.  In 1961, Boden became captain-coach of the Parramatta side but they once again finished last on the table.  Boden spent a further two seasons at Parramatta before retiring at the end of 1963.  In retirement, Boden continued to be involved with the club for many years.

Personal life
He was married to Marie and the couple had four daughters and a son.

He died near Wyong on 24 August 2015, 53 days before his 79th birthday.

References

1936 births
2015 deaths
Australia national rugby league team players
Australian rugby league coaches
Australian rugby league players
Parramatta Eels captains
Parramatta Eels coaches
Parramatta Eels players
Rugby league centres
Rugby league players from New South Wales